Ryan O'Donoghue is a Gaelic footballer who plays at club level for Belmullet and at senior level for the Mayo county team.

References

Living people
Gaelic football forwards
Mayo inter-county Gaelic footballers
Year of birth missing (living people)